Fred Jay Barrows (born April 5, 1956, in Attleboro, Massachusetts) is the current member of the Massachusetts House of Representatives for the 1st Bristol district. Barrows has represented the district since 2007.

Electoral History 
 <ref}}

See also
 2019–2020 Massachusetts legislature
 2021–2022 Massachusetts legislature

References

Republican Party members of the Massachusetts House of Representatives
People from Attleboro, Massachusetts
Living people
1956 births
21st-century American politicians
Mansfield High School alumni